Rigdon is an unincorporated community in Green Township, Grant County, and in Duck Creek Township, Madison County, Indiana.

History
Rigdon was named for Dr. Pryor Rigdon, a local resident. The community had a post office between 1855 and 1912.

Geography

Notable people
Willard Gemmill, Justice of the Indiana Supreme Court.

References

Unincorporated communities in Grant County, Indiana
Unincorporated communities in Madison County, Indiana
Unincorporated communities in Indiana